PIM or Pim may refer to:

Computing 
 Parallel inference machine, an intended fifth generation computer
 Personal information management
 Personal information manager software
 Personal Information Module for PalmDOS
 Personal Iterations Multiplier for VeraCrypt
 Platform-independent model in software engineering
 Protocol Independent Multicast, Internet protocols
 Processor-in-memory, CPU and memory on the same chip
 Process-in-memory, do calculations, i.e. MAC operations in a memory rather than in a CPU

Engineering, science, and mathematics 
 Passive intermodulation of signals
 Phosphatidylmyo-inositol mannosides, a glycolipid component of the cell wall of Mycobacterium tuberculosis
 Principal indecomposable module in mathematical module theory

Business 
 Product information management
 Partnerized Inventory Management
 Pim Brothers & Co., large Irish family business founded in the nineteenth century

People

Given name
 Pim (name)

Surname
 Bedford Clapperton Trevelyan Pim, (1826-1886), Royal Navy officer
 Jonathan Pim (1806–1885), Irish politician
 Jonathan Pim (1858–1949), Irish lawyer and politician
 Joshua Pim (1869-1942), Irish doctor and tennis player
 Raymond Pim (1897–1993), American politician

Fictional
 Pim Diffy, a character in TV series Phil of the Future

Places 
 Pimhill or Pim Hill, England
 Pim Island, Canada
 Pim (river), Russia
 Pondok Indah Mall, Indonesia

Other uses 
 Pacific Islands Monthly, a news magazine, discontinued 2000
 Penalty (ice hockey) (Penalties infraction minutes)
 Pim Fortuyn List, Dutch political party
 Pim weight in ancient Israel
 Prague International Marathon
 Providence Industrial Mission
 Public Illumination Magazine

See also 
 Pimm's, alcoholic beverages
 Pym (disambiguation)